The 2002 Open SEAT Godó, also known as Trofeo Godó, was a men's tennis tournament played on outdoor clay courts at the Real Club de Tenis Barcelona in Barcelona, Spain and was part of the International Series Gold of the 2002 ATP Tour. It was the 50th edition of the tournament and ran from 22 April until 28 April 2002. Unseeded Gastón Gaudio won the singles title.

Finals

Singles

 Gastón Gaudio defeated  Albert Costa 6–4, 6–0, 6–2
 It was Gaudio's first singles title of his career.

Doubles

 Michael Hill /  Daniel Vacek defeated  Lucas Arnold /  Gastón Etlis 6–4, 6–4
 It was Hill's only title of the year and the 3rd of his career. It was Vacek's only title of the year and the 25th of his career.

References

External links
 Official website
 ATP tournament profile

 
2002
Open SEAT Godo
2002 in Catalan sport